State Route 377 (SR 377) is a short  north-south in Marion County, Tennessee. It serves as a northern continuation of Alabama State Route 73 (SR 73) beyond the state line, connecting it with the town of New Hope.

Route description

SR 377 begins at the Alabama state line, where it continues south toward Bryant as Alabama State Route 73 (SR 73). It winds its way south through wooded areas as it descends Sand Mountain as a two-lane highway. It then enters New Hope and comes to an end at an intersection with SR 156 along the banks of Nickajack Lake/Tennessee River, at the eastern edge of town.

Major intersections

References

377
Transportation in Marion County, Tennessee